Clearing bank may refer to:

 Clearing (finance), a bank that participates in the system to clear (finalize) financial transactions
Cheque and Credit Clearing Company, United Kingdom